Sjoerd Ars (born 15 April 1984) is a Dutch former professional footballer who played as a striker.

Career

Youth career
Ars played in the youth of DVC'26 from the town of Didam, and was later picked up by Dutch giants, Feyenoord. He never broke through to the first team, and chose to play professionally for De Graafschap.

Dutch second division
After one season in Doetinchem, he decided to sign with FC Omniworld, a club that became a licensed pro-club that year. In his first season in Almere, Ars scored 17 goals.

He later played four successful seasons for Go Ahead Eagles and RBC Roosendaal.

FC Zwolle
In 2010, Ars signed a contract at FC Zwolle. He started the season well by scoring 11 goals in his first 10 league matches. He finished the season with 28 goals, scored in 33 matches.

Levski Sofia
His great season with FC Zwolle was enough to be signed by Bulgarian side PFC Levski Sofia. Ars arrived in Sofia on 23 June 2011 and signed a three-year contract the next day. On 28 July 2011, in his official debut for Levski, he came on as a substitute and scored the winning goal for the 2–1 win over FC Spartak Trnava. Ars also netted a goal to open the scoring in the return leg, while Levski were eventually eliminated after losing the penalty shootout to decide the match (the aggregate score at the end of extra time was 3–3). On 6 November 2011, he scored a brace in the 3–2 home win over Loko Plovdiv in an A Group match.

Tianjin Teda
In February 2012, Ars went to Chinese Super League side Tianjin Teda on loan. Tianjin Teda also had an option to make the move permanent in the end of the 2012 league season. He made his official debut for Tianjin on 25 February, in a 2–1 CFA Super Cup defeat against Guangzhou Evergrande.

After spells in Turkey, Ars returned to the Netherlands to join NEC Nijmegen. He topped the Eerste Divisie top goalscorers charts at the end of the club's title winning 2014–15 season and moved on to NAC. In summer 2016, Ars left NAC Breda for Hungarian side Szombathelyi Haladás.

He played for De Treffers in the Dutch Tweede Divisie in the 2018–19 season before retiring in December 2018.

Career statistics

Honours
NEC
Eerste Divisie: 2014–15

References

External links
 Voetbal International: Sjoerd Ars 
 Profile at Levskisofia.info 

1984 births
Living people
People from Oude IJsselstreek
Association football forwards
Dutch footballers
Dutch expatriate footballers
De Graafschap players
Almere City FC players
Go Ahead Eagles players
RBC Roosendaal players
PEC Zwolle players
PFC Levski Sofia players
Tianjin Jinmen Tiger F.C. players
Konyaspor footballers
Karşıyaka S.K. footballers
NEC Nijmegen players
NAC Breda players
Szombathelyi Haladás footballers
Fortuna Sittard players
De Treffers players
Eredivisie players
Eerste Divisie players
Tweede Divisie players
First Professional Football League (Bulgaria) players
Nemzeti Bajnokság I players
TFF First League players
Chinese Super League players
Expatriate footballers in Bulgaria
Expatriate footballers in Hungary
Expatriate footballers in China
Expatriate footballers in Turkey
Dutch expatriate sportspeople in Bulgaria
Dutch expatriate sportspeople in China
Dutch expatriate sportspeople in Turkey
Dutch expatriate sportspeople in Hungary
Footballers from Gelderland